Casper Ludvig Widell (born 5 May 2003) is a Swedish footballer, currently playing as a centre-back for Helsingborgs IF.

Club career 
Born in Landskrona, in the Swedish province of Scania, Widell started playing football as a child in the local club IK Wormo, together with his brother Melker (who later joined the youth sector of Malmö FF). Originally a striker in his childhood, he was later moved down to the midfield.

In 2016, he was noticed by Helsingborgs IF scouts and later joined the club's academy, where he was told to adjust his playing position once more, thus becoming a centre-back. After featuring in the 2018 edition of the Gothia Cup with his team, Widell quickly rose through the youth ranks of Helsingborgs' academy: while being a regular for the U17 side, in 2019 he was selected for the U19 squad despite his younger age.

At the start of 2020, following his impressive performances at academy level and injuries occurred to several members of the senior squad, Widell was invited by head coach Olof Mellberg to join training sessions with the first team, ending up featuring in the second half of a pre-season friendly against Danish side Lyngby BK. As the regular season of the Allsvenskan started, Mellberg decided to give Widell a spot in the first team, and the young centre-back made his professional debut on June 15, 2020 in the first game of the season, against Varbergs BoIS: he played the entirety of the match as his club eventually suffered a 0-3 home loss. During the season, he featured for Helsingborgs six more times, two of which as a starter. However, he was involved in his club's relegation at the end of the year, as they finished second to last in the league table.

Nevertheless, after some speculation during the previous year, on February 10, 2021 Helsingborgs officially announced that they had agreed with Widell to extend his contract until 2023.

International career 
A youth international for Sweden, Widell played for and captained the under-16 and under-17 national team.

Personal life 
He has an older brother, named Melker (born 19 April 2002), who is also a footballer and currently plays for the under-19 side of Malmö FF.

Their father Mikael played as a goalkeeper in the minor leagues of Swedish football.

During his time at Helsingborgs, Widell has indicated his coach Olof Mellberg and the team's captain, Andreas Granqvist, as his main mentors: they both were centre-backs themselves, as well as full internationals for the Swedish national team.

Career statistics

Club

Notes

References

2003 births
Living people
Swedish footballers
Sweden youth international footballers
Association football defenders
Allsvenskan players
Helsingborgs IF players
People from Landskrona Municipality
Footballers from Skåne County